Elections to the West Virginia House of Delegates took place on November 3, 2020. All the seats in the West Virginia House of Delegates were up for election.

Overview 
The Republican Party, cementing their hold over West Virginia state politics, made a gain of eighteen seats in the House of Delegates, holding over three fourths of the chamber's seats and achieving supermajority status. The scope of the Republicans' gains, which swept many traditionally Democratic areas, was unexpected on both sides of the aisle, with both Democrats and Republicans expressing surprise at the results. The election, further eroding the Democrats' caucus in the House, is a part of a decades-long shift in power statewide from Democrats to Republicans.

Predictions

Speaker Election 
On January 13, 2021, the first regular session of the 85th West Virginia Legislature convened, and the election of the speaker took place. 98 delegates voted, while two were not counted as present in the roll call.  From the majority caucus, incumbent speaker Roger Hanshaw was nominated by Kayla Kessinger, and seconded by Jeffrey Pack. Doug Skaff, the new Democratic leader, was nominated by Brent Boggs, and was seconded by Lisa Zukoff. On a vote along party lines, Hanshaw was elected with the support of 76 delegates, including then-Democrat Mick Bates, while Skaff received 22 votes.

Results

District 1

District 2

District 3

District 4

District 5

District 6

District 7

District 8

District 9

District 10

District 11

District 12

District 13

District 14

District 15

District 16

District 17

District 18

District 19

District 20

District 21

District 22

District 23

District 24

District 25

District 26

District 27

District 28

District 29

District 30

District 31

District 32

District 33

District 34

District 35

District 36

District 37

District 38

District 39

District 40

District 41

District 42

District 43

District 44

District 45

District 46

District 47

District 48

District 49

District 50

District 51

District 52

District 53

District 54

District 55

District 56

District 57

District 58

District 59

District 60

District 61

District 62

District 63

District 64

District 65

District 66

District 67

References

External links 
 Election at Ballotpedia
 
 
  (State affiliate of the U.S. League of Women Voters)
 West Virginia Secretary of State Candidate Listing

House
West Virginia House
West Virginia House of Delegates elections